Old Colwyn railway station was located in Colwyn, Denbighshire, North Wales, situated between the town to the south and the sea to the north.

History
The station was opened 9 April 1884 by the London and North Western Railway, it was served by what is now the North Wales Coast Line between Chester, Cheshire and Holyhead, Anglesey. Initially known as simply Colwyn station, it was changed to Old Colwyn in 1885 after passengers confused it with the next station along the line, Colwyn Bay.

The primary purpose for the opening of the station was to satisfy the demand caused by holidaymakers from the industrial cities of Liverpool, Manchester and The English Midlands. Located about a mile east of Colwyn Bay station, it consisted of two staggered platforms with waiting rooms on both, sidings and a coal yard. Due to its proximity to the other station, Old Colwyn was closed to passengers on 1 December 1952 and to goods traffic on 4 May 1964. The line through the station site is still in place and both passenger and freight services pass through regularly.

References

Further reading

Disused railway stations in Denbighshire
Former London and North Western Railway stations
Railway stations in Great Britain opened in 1884
Railway stations in Great Britain closed in 1964